Halcyon Gallery is an art gallery in London. Founded in 1982 in Birmingham, it displays work from established and emerging contemporary artists, particularly impressionism and pop art.

Location
The gallery is located on New Bond Street in Mayfair, London.

Overview
The gallery was founded in 1982. It represents a selection of renowned international artists. It hosts a programme of contemporary art, showing both established artists and new, emerging talent. It specialises in impressionism and pop art. Ehud Sheleg, the treasurer of the UK's Conservative Party, became director in 1999.

Halcyon Gallery is 50% controlled through a British Virgin Islands company by the Tov Settlement, the Sheleg family trust.

Investigations by Private Eye magazine allege Halcyon Gallery's and Ehoud Sheleg's financial affairs are a "Byzantine and outlandish world of bizarre art deals, unpaid bills, dodgy Russian connections...".

References

External links
Halcyon Gallery Website

Mayfair
Art galleries in London